Leading Angel Public School (LAPS), Hisar is a private day-boarding co-educational school in Amar Deep Colony, Kamiri Rd (in front of Hanuman Moorti), Hisar, Haryana, 125001, India.

History
School was founded in April 1998 by the experienced educator and army veteran of 1962 Sino-Indian War Ch. Ramchander Dalal.

Management
The school is run by the School Management Committee (SMC) under the leadership of principal Mrs. Bimla Dalal, a prominent sportsperson.

Affiliation
The school is affiliated with the Haryana Board of School Education (BSEH).

To maintain the quality of education, every year the school is visited by the government-appointed Block Resource Center (BRC) coordinator and Circle Resource Center (CRC) coordinator".

Campus
The Leading Angel Public School (LAPS), Hisar'' has one campus in Amar Deep Colony, Kamiri Rd (in front of Hanuman Moorti), Hisar, Haryana, 125004, India, Phone: +91 1662 244777.

Admissions and scademic session
Admissions are open every year from March. The academic session session runs for 230 days from April until February or March with 40-day-long summer holidays in May and June, 10-day-long Dussera holidays in September, winter holidays, two to three weeks post-exam holidays in March and April and public holidays.

The school has Continuous and Comprehensive Evaluation scheme and maintains pupil's record as per the requirements of the Right to Education Act (RTE).

Facilities

Classrooms
The school is a 3-story building, housing classrooms, science laboratories, computer rooms, a library, arts, and music facilities.

Laboratories
The school's three-story building also has laboratories for physics, chemistry and biology. 3

Library
The school has its own in-house library with 250+ books.

Computer
The school has a computer-aided learning program as well as a separate computer room with an internet connection.

Co-curricular activities
The school has facilities for the arts and music. The school organizes several annual festivals, including a welcome function, a farewell function, an annual cultural function, Children's Day, Independence Day, Republic Day, etc.

Sports activities
Since the founding Principal and key staff members are national-level multiple medal winning sports stars, they place a special emphasis on sports. School has several sports facilities, including daily and weekly games periods, annual sports and athletics days.

Transport
The school has its own private bus transport.

Midday Meal
This school also runs government of India's free Midday Meal Scheme.

Alumni
The school has produced several successful alumni who are now engineers and doctors.

External links
 Leading Angel Public School (LAPS), Hisar – Official page
 LAPS on Google Map
 LAPS Official Profile on Google

See also

 List of schools in Hisar
 Thakur Dass Bhargava Senior Secondary Model School
 Indus Public School, Hisar
 Indus Group of Institutions
 Abhimanyu Sindhu
 Badya Jattan
 Kanwari
 Bidhwan
 Bidhwan Jaglan Zaildar clan

References

Schools in Hisar (city)
Private schools in Haryana